The human identical sequence (HIS) is a sequence of RNA elements, 24-27 nucleotides in length, that coronavirus genomes share with the human genome. In pathogenic progression, HIS acts as a NamiRNA (nuclear activating miRNA) through the NamiRNA-enhancer network to activate neighboring host genes. The first HIS elements was identified in the SARS-CoV-2 genome, which has five HIS elements; other human coronaviruses have one to five. It has been suggested that these sequences can be more generally termed "host identical sequences" since similar correlations have been found between the genome of SARS-CoV-2 and multiple potential hosts (bats, pangolins, ferrets, and cats).

SARS-CoV-2

SARS-CoV-1

MERS-CoV

HCoV-HKU1

HCoV-NL63

HCoV-OC43

HCoV-229E

References 

MicroRNA
Coronaviridae